Bromley and Chislehurst is a constituency represented in the House of Commons of the Parliament of the United Kingdom since 2006 by Bob Neill, a Conservative.

Constituency profile
This constituency is relatively prosperous in terms of income, has low unemployment and is largely suburban with significant parkland and sports areas. Most of the housing is owner-occupied although there are significant proportions of social housing in parts of Mottingham and Bromley Common. The 2011 census shows that the borough is 84.3% White European/British, lower than the national average (86%) and higher than then London average (59%). Until 2006 it was one of the Conservative Party's safest seats but the by-election of that year saw the party's electoral majority fall steeply from over 13,000 (in the 2005 election) to just over 600 votes (see below - "Election results"). They have since rebuilt this majority, which currently stands at just under 11,000.

History
The Bromley parliamentary constituency was created in 1918. In 1974 Bromley became Ravensbourne.

Before the 1997 election western wards of Chislehurst merged with eastern wards in Ravensbourne to form Bromley and Chislehurst.

Bromley/Ravensbourne/Chislehurst summary
The earlier Bromley, later Ravensbourne, seat was markedly prosperous in regional terms and did not elect Labour Party MPs during its 1918 to 1974 existence.  One of the Ravensbourne wards, Plaistow and Sundridge, had a Communist Councillor in the 1940s.  Prime Minister (1957-1963) Harold Macmillan was the MP for Bromley from 1945 until his retirement in 1964, when he was succeeded by John Hunt. Hunt, on the left of the Conservative party, held the seat (renamed Ravensbourne in 1974) until 1997.

The Chislehurst seat had a Labour Party MP from 1966 until 1970.

A by-election was held on 29 June 2006, upon the death of the previous MP Eric Forth the month before, which returned London Assembly member Bob Neill as the new Conservative MP with an electoral majority of just over 600 votes - compared to the previous Conservative majority of over 13,000 in the 2005 general election.  Turnout was down by a significant margin. In 2010 Bob Neill was re-elected with a Conservative majority greater than that achieved in 2005.

Boundaries
1997–2010: The London Borough of Bromley wards of Bickley, Bromley Common and Keston, Chislehurst, Hayes, Martins Hill and Town, Mottingham, and Plaistow and Sundridge.

2010–present: The London Borough of Bromley wards of Bickley, Bromley Town, Chislehurst, Cray Valley West, Mottingham and Chislehurst North, and Plaistow and Sundridge.

Bromley and Chislehurst constituency covers the northern part of the London Borough of Bromley including the east of Bromley, its town centre, and Chislehurst.

Members of Parliament

Election results

Elections in the 2010s

Elections in the 2000s

Elections in the 1990s

See also
List of parliamentary constituencies in London

Notes

References

Further reading
Cook, Chris and Ramsden, John. By-elections in British politics (Routledge, 2003)

External links
nomis Constituency Profile for Bromley and Chislehurst — presenting data from the ONS annual population survey and other official statistics.
Politics Resources (Election results from 1922 onwards)
Electoral Calculus (Election results from 1955 onwards)

Politics of the London Borough of Bromley
Parliamentary constituencies in London
Constituencies of the Parliament of the United Kingdom established in 1997